Salvatore Toscano (Imola, 5 July 1897 – Aegean Sea, 28 March 1941) was an Italian naval officer during World War II.

Biography 

Toscano was born in Imola, province of Bologna, in 1897. After graduating as Ensign from the Naval Academy of Livorno in 1915, he served on various ships during World War I, being promoted to Lieutenant in 1918. In 1926 he was promoted to Lieutenant Commander and in 1932, after commanding the destroyer  for two years, he was promoted to Commander and appointed vice deputy commander of the Naval Academy of Livorno.

In 1935 he was transferred to the Royal Hydrographic Institute of Genoa and in 1937 he was promoted to Captain, holding in succession the command of the light cruiser , the battleship  and the light cruiser . In November 1938 he was appointed president of the Commission for the Experimentation of War Material (Mariperman) in La Spezia, and from 12 April 1940 to 10 March 1941 he served as Chief of Staff of the Naval Command of Messina.

A few weeks later, he participated in the battle of Cape Matapan, in which the 1st Naval Division, of which the 9th Destroyer Squadron was part, was annihilated by the battleships of the Mediterranean Fleet in a nocturnal engagement. Alfieri, under the command of Toscano, was the only Italian ship that was able to put up a reaction, firing her guns and some torpedoes at the attackers before being hit and disabled by British gunfire. Toscano then ordered the survivors to set off the scuttling charges and abandon ship; declining his subordinates' request to join them on the rafts, he withdrew to the bridge and went down with the ship. He was posthumously awarded the Gold Medal of Military Valor.

References

1897 births
1941 deaths
Recipients of the Gold Medal of Military Valor
Regia Marina personnel of World War II
People lost at sea
Italian military personnel of World War II
Italian military personnel killed in World War II
Captains who went down with the ship